KBTF-CD (channel 31) is a low-power, Class A television station in Bakersfield, California, United States, broadcasting the Spanish-language UniMás network. It is owned and operated by TelevisaUnivision alongside Class A Univision outlet KABE-CD (channel 39) and Twist affiliate KUVI-DT (channel 45). The three stations share studios on Truxtun Avenue in the western section of Bakersfield; KBTF-CD's transmitter is located atop Breckenridge Mountain.

In addition to its own digital signal, KBTF-CD is simulcast in high definition on the third digital subchannel of KUVI (45.3) from a transmitter atop Mount Adelaide.

History
Univision acquired the channel 39 license for Bakersfield during 1980. During the station's first years when it began broadcasting on the day after Memorial Day in 1988, it would be named as "Univision 39 K39AB" because it served as a translator for KFTV. Univision later moved the frequency to channel 31 in 1998 and it was renamed KABE-LP. It served as a repeater for KSUV-LP and was co-branded as "KSUV Univision 39 & KABE 31". Univision's original station in Bakersfield, KSUV-LP (channel 39, now KABE-CA) became a charter station of TeleFutura (now UniMás) when it was launched in 2002 and was renamed "KBTF-LP TeleFutura 39”. Univision remained on channel 31 branded as "KABE Univision 31". In 2004, the station swapped callsigns with KBTF-LP and became the new KABE-LP while TeleFutura moved to channel 31. During 2014 the station obtained Class A status.

Subchannels
The station's digital signal is multiplexed:

References

External links 

Low-power television stations in the United States
BTF-CD
UniMás network affiliates
GetTV affiliates
Ion Mystery affiliates
BTF-CD
Television channels and stations established in 1988
1991 establishments in California